The Season of Death is the debut album by the melodic death metal project Symphony of Heaven. The project began in 2017, starting off with an EP, titled ...Of Scars and Soil..., with all three tracks being re-recorded and released again on the album. The album was recorded at Commander86 Studios, by the band's brainchild, Logan Thompson and was produced by Luke Dinan of Children of Wrath.

The album was released via Nosral Recordings. The artwork premiered through Indie Vision Music. The band released a lyric video for the track "In Anger's Midst" following the album's release.

Critical reception
The album received mixed to good reviews, receiving reviews from The Metal Resource, Indie Vision Music, Mind Noise Network, and several others.

The Metal Resource writer Ankit Sood gave the album a 7 out of 10, stating "For a debut album I gave it a good listen, and often more than usual and I couldn’t help listen to it over and over again. There is some promising music delivered but I feel it is yet to hit maturity (here’s hoping for more music in the future) Do give it a listen!!" Sputnikmusic writers gave the album an average of 3 out of 5, with only two reviews occurring. The Metal Onslaught owner Christian Sullivan gave the album a 7 out of 10, similar to Sood, stating "My final words from this effort from “Symphony Of Heaven”. It is a solid release for a debutant.
solo project. Definitely holding to the old school ways of Black Metal, but to me that’s just what it is."

Former Indie Vision Music writer – and later drummer for the band – Mason Beard gave the album a 5 out of 5, writing "Overall, the album is certainly one of the best I’ve heard all year, if not the best. I encourage anyone who loves bands like Death Requisite, Horde, Dimmu Borgir, or Mortification to pick this album up!". Chris Gatto of Heaven's Metal Magazine gave the album a 4 out of 5, commenting that "An excellent debut that has stayed in my cd player for a long time." Mind Noise Network journalist Dave Barlow gave the album an 8 out of 10, reviewing "I’moing to make a confession to my fellow underground metalheads, I don’t like black metal. Never Have. I’ve never got it. But this album is different.  It’s like when you meet someone new and you’re drawn to them. Something about them just sparks something down deep. your imagination starts to run wild and you’re physically and emotionally altered. It’s not an overstatement to say that’s how this album made feel. So who knows, maybe there is hope for me yet and maybe Logan Thompson is the man to convert me (in more ways than one!)."

Track listing

Personnel
Symphony of Heaven
 Logan Thompson – vocals, instrumentation

Production
 Luke Dinan – mastering, producer
 Threadbare Artwork – artwork

References

2017 debut albums
Symphony of Heaven albums